Oru Naal Varum is a 2010 Indian Malayalam-language satirical film directed by T. K. Rajeev Kumar, written by Sreenivasan, and produced by Maniyanpilla Raju. It stars Mohanlal and Sameera Reddy in her Malayalam debut, with Sreenivasan, Devayani, Nazriya Nazim and Esther Anil in supporting roles. The film's soundtrack was composed by M. G. Sreekumar. Oru Naal Varum was released on 9 July 2010. The plot deals with corruption in India.

Plot

Gopi Krishnan, his wife Rajalakshmi and daughter Dhanya are enjoying their moments at Kutralam Waterfalls. Soon it is revealed that Gopi Krishnan is a corrupt assistant town planner using a government vehicle to come on holiday in Tamil Nadu during his duty hours. As his driver takes him back to his station in Kerala he has an altercation with Sukumaran, whose identity and profession are not yet revealed.

Sukumaran lives in a rented flat with his daughter. There is also a sub-plot involving the child custody battle between Nandhakumar and his wife Meera. Later, Sukumaran is seen at the town planning office trying to get a building permit, and meets Vasudevan, who is also having difficulty with building permits. In reality, Sukumaran is in disguise and is actually a vigilance officer named Nandhakumar trying to arrest Gopi Krishnan in a corruption case.

Nandhakumar makes three attempts to get evidence against Gopi Krishnan. The first two fail, because Nandhakumar's subordinate Sunny leaked the plans to Gopi Krishnan. Vasudevan commits suicide after the first failure. Finally after catching Sunny, the third attempt succeeds, though there is confusion over the evidence and some thugs attempt to murder Gopi Krishnan while he is in police custody.

However, Nandhakumar loses his court case against his wife and has to give up his daughter. Faced with the collapse of his corrupt life, Gopi Krishnan agrees to work with Nandhakumar to root out corrupt real estate developers. Meera returns Nandhakumar's daughter to him, saying that she could not handle her crying for her father all the time.

Cast

 Mohanlal as Kulappulli Sukumaran / Vigilance DySP Nandhakumar
 Sreenivasan as ATPO Gopi Krishnan
 Sameera Reddy as Meera, Nandakumar's wife
 Devayani as Rajalekshmi, Gopikrishnan's wife
 Suraj Venjaramoodu as Driver Girijan
 Nazriya Nazim as Dhanya Gopi Krishnan
 Esther Anil as Nandhakumar's daughter
 Nedumudi Venu as Havildar Vasudevan (Retd)
 Lalu Alex as Vinod Abraham, Vigilance SP
 Siddique as K.N.C
 Maniyanpilla Raju as Ramesh
 Ambika Mohan as Family Court Judge
 Aliyar as George Sebastian, Advocate of Nandhakumar
 T. P. Madhavan
 Kottayam Nazir
 Fathima Babu 
 Indrans
 Jayakrishnan as Advocate Santhosh
 Biju Pappan as Vigilance SI Mukundan
 Dinesh Panicker as Vigilance CI Ravi

Production
The film was produced by Maniyanpilla Raju under the company Maniyanpilla Raju Productions. Oru Naal Varum was the maiden film of Sameera Reddy in the Malayalam cinema.

Soundtrack 

The film features songs composed by M. G. Sreekumar, with lyrics by Murukan Kattakada .

Release
The film was originally planned to be released on 7 May 2010 and was censored by the Central Board of Film Certification on 7 April 2010. But it was delayed by two months due to a strike in the Malayalam film industry. The film was released on 9 July 2010.

Reception
The Indian Express wrote that "the plot is well-constructed and the element of satire well worked out. The film retains the interest of the audience till the end". Sify called the film "above average" and said: "Oru Naal Varum handles a relevant issue, but the problem here is the way it has been told. Of course, even in its current shape, the film is really good when compared to the rest of the movies that are being churned out in Malayalam these days". Rediff.com rated 2 out of 5 and stated that "The first half works wonderfully due to the presence of a lively and humorous Mohanlal. Sadly, he transforms into somebody else just before intermission: as if to do justice to his superstar image ... Oru Naal Varum may be a well intended social satire but it ends up as a conundrum".

Awards
Kerala State Film Awards
 Best Comedy Artist – Suraj Venjaramood

Asianet Film Awards
 Best Lyricist - Murukan Kattakada
 Best Music Director - M. G. Sreekumar

Asiavision Awards
 Best Socially Committed Movie
 Best Music Director - M. G. Sreekumar

Jaihind TV Film Awards
 Best Music Director - M. G. Sreekumar
 Best Female Playback Singer - Shweta Mohan
 Best Comedy Artist - Suraj Venjaramood

References

External links 
 
 
 http://www.nowrunning.com/movie/7209/malayalam/oru-naal-varum/index.htm
 
 http://popcorn.oneindia.in/title/7823/oru-naal-varum.html

2010 films
Indian satirical films
2010s Malayalam-language films
Films with screenplays by Sreenivasan
Films about corruption in India
Films directed by T. K. Rajeev Kumar